Ann Wheeler Harnwell Ashmead (born Princeton, New Jersey, October 7, 1929) is an American archaeologist who has co-authored comprehensive catalogues with the archaeologist Etruscologist Kyle Meredith Phillips, Jr. about the Greek Vase Painting collections of Bryn Mawr College (1971) and the Rhode Island School of Design (1976).  She has also written the main published catalogue for the Antiquities Collection of Haverford College (1999). and many articles on Greek Vases.

Education and early career
During World War II Ashmead moved with her family from the East Coast to the West to La Jolla, California, while her father Gaylord P. Harnwell, a Professor of Physics at the University of Pennsylvania, was directing the U. S. Navy Radio and Sound Laboratory at the Naval Base Point Loma in San Diego and developing FM Sonar for submarines. During the war, she attended The Bishop's School (La Jolla) and afterwards, upon returning East, she graduated from Lower Merion High School. She received her archaeology education at Bryn Mawr College, BA (1952, Honors, Magna Cum Laude)  MA (1954); PhD (1959) in Classical Archaeology with Rhys Carpenter. Her thesis was on the Onesimos (vase painter). At Bryn Mawr College professional colleagues included Brunilde Sismondo Ridgway, Machteld Mellink and Kyle Phillips. Awarded an Ella Riegel Fellowship, Ashmead worked with Lucy Talcott in 1956-1957 at the American School of Classical Studies at Athens on the excavations at the Ancient Agora of Athens publishing on fragments by the Kleophrades Painter under the Directorship of Homer Thompson with his wife also an archaeologist Dorothy Burr Thompson. Ashmead then taught at Bryn Mawr College and was the Curator for Ella Riegel Museum. She became a Research Associate with the University of Pennsylvania Museum of Archaeology and Anthropology having written and compiled its Corpus vasorum antiquorum with the late Kyle Phillips.

Circle of archaeologists and classicists
Other colleagues and circle of archaeologists and classicists include Richmond Lattimore, Richard Green, Phyllis Pray Bober, Ingrid Edlund Berry, Theresa Howard Carter, Jess Jeanny Canby, Crawford Hallock Greenewalt, Jr., Adrienne Mayor, Jocelyn Penny Small and Dyfri Williams.

Expertise
Ann Ashmead is a classical Greek vase painting expert, the leading authority on depictions of cats, particularly the Cheetah, on 5th Century Red-Figured Greek Vases. Ashmead has also introduced technical sections in her catalogues, through the use of x-rays, including references to kiln stacking marks, under-painting and preliminary sketches, fingerprints, and fuller inscriptions, and details garnered through technological examination, before it became a more commonly accepted practice in writing about Greek Vases.

Family

She is the great-great-granddaughter of Nathaniel Wheeler one of the American inventors of the sewing machine and a descendant of Jonathan Edwards (theologian) President of Princeton and cousin to Marion Edwards Park President of Bryn Mawr College who also received all three degrees at the College and worked in the Agora. Ashmead was the first woman in her immediate family of notable American educators including college/university Presidents to receive a PhD.  For most of Ashmead's career, she was married to the Haverford College professor and writer John Ashmead. He married Ann Harnwell on October 15, 1949. They had five children: John Ashmead, Graham Gaylord Ashmead, Gaylord Harnwell Ashmead, Louisa Harral Ashmead and Theodora Wheeler Ashmead. They divorced in 1976.

Selected works
 Corpus Vasorum Antiquorum. [United States of America]. The Ella Riegel Memorial Museum, Bryn Mawr College.(1971) by Ann Harnwell Ashmead and Kyle Meredith Phillips.
 Classical Vases : Excluding Attic Black-Figure, Attic Red-Figure and Attic White Ground, Catalogue of the Classical Collection, Museum of Art Rhode Island School of Design, (1976) by Ann Harnwell Ashmead and Kyle Meredith Phillips, Jr., dedicated to Richmond Lattimore and Richard Stillwell.
 Haverford College Collection of Classical Antiquities,(1999) by Ann Harnwell Ashmead.
 “Fragments by the Kleophrades Painter from the Athenian Agora,” Hesperia 35 (1966), pp. 20–36, pls. 7-12.
 “An Unpublished Cup by Makron in Philadelphia,” American Journal of Archaeology 70 (1966) pp. 66–68 in collaboration with Kyle Meredith Phillips.
 “A Chong Byong at Bryn Mawr College and its twin in Honolulu,” Archives of Asian Art XX (1966–67), pp 80–81.
 Contributor to The Frederick M. Watkins College, The Fogg Art Museum, January 31, 1973 to March 31, 1974, pp. 45–52 in collaboration with Kyle Meredith Phillips.
 “Greek Cats: Exotic Pets Kept by Rich Youths in Fifth Century B.C. Athens as Portrayed on Greek Vases,” Expedition vol. 20, no. 3, Spring 1978, pp. 38–47.
 “Three Goddesses and a Falcon,” Studies in Classical Art and Archaeology:  A Tribute to Peter Heinrich von Blanckenhagen, Locust Valley, New York, 1979 (Edited by G. Kopcke and M. Moore) 45-52, with Kyle Meredith Phillips.
 “Undoing the Past:  Changing Attitudes Towards the Restoration of Greek Pots,” Expedition, vol. 30, no.2 (1989) pp. 21–28, with Kyle Meredith Phillips. https://www.penn.museum/sites/expedition/volume/30/page/2/
 “A Lekythos by the Pan Painter at Haverford College:  Bread and Soup for Dinner?,” Eumousia: Ceramic and Iconographic Studies in Honor of Alexander Cambitoglou Mediterranean Archaeology Mediterranean Archaeology Suppl. I Edited by Jean-Paul Descoeudres (Sydney, 1990), pp. 95–103.
 “A  Monstrously Good Idea,” Review of Adrienne Mayor article, Paleocryptozoology, Vol. 9, (1991).
 “The Tame Etruscan Cat:  Classical Conformist or Etruscan Original,” Murlo and the Etruscans: Art and Society in Ancient Etruria Edited by Richard De Puma and Jocelyn Penny Small (Madison, Wisconsin, 1994).

References

People from Princeton, New Jersey
1929 births
Bryn Mawr College alumni
American non-fiction writers
American classical scholars
Women classical scholars
American archaeologists
Scientists from Philadelphia
American women archaeologists
Living people
Classical scholars of Bryn Mawr College
Classical archaeologists
American women non-fiction writers
Lower Merion High School alumni
21st-century American women